Charles Henry Dickinson  (1871–1930) was Archdeacon of Bristol from 1921 until 1927.

Dickinson educated at Haileybury and Keble College, Oxford. He was ordained deacon in 1895  and priest in 1896. After curacies in Cricklade  and Brandon Hill  he was Vicar of All Saints, Bristol from 1905 until his Archdeacon’s appointment.

He died on 10 January 1930. Thorold Dickinson, his son, was a filmmaker.

References

1871 births
1930 deaths
Alumni of Keble College, Oxford
Archdeacons of Bristol
People educated at Haileybury and Imperial Service College